Suteuphaa was the second king of Ahom kingdom who ruled from 1268 CE to 1281 CE. Suteuphaa succeeded his father Sukaphaa, who laid the foundation of Ahom kingdom in Assam. His reign was characterized by the expansion of his father’s kingdom. He also had conflicts with the Shans or Naras of Mungkang, a Shan kingdom in Upper Burma.

Ancestry and accession
Suteuphaa was the eldest son of Ahom king Sukaphaa. After a reign of 39 years, Sukaphaa died in 1268 CE. The nobles installed Suteuphaa as the new king of Ahom kingdom. After his accession, Suteuphaa sent embassy to the ancestral homeland of Sukaphaa, informing its ruler Sukhranphaa, the brother of Sukaphaa, about the demise of Sukaphaa and his accession to the throne. Sukhranphaa sent gifts to Suteuphaa consisting of  caps made of gold and silver and two specially designed bows, congratulating his coronation as the king of Ahom kingdom.

Reign

Expansion of the kingdom

Suteuphaa desired to expand his father’s kingdom. Therefore, in order to fulfill his desire, he came in conflicts with the Kacharis residing in the neighbouring region. At that time, many parts of Upper Assam were inhabited by the Kacharis, though it was not known whether all the Kachari tribes were part of the same kingdom. He forced the Kacharis to abandon the country which lies to the east of Dikhou river. One of the Ahom Buranji or historical document describes the event in an interesting way. Suteuphaa claimed the track east of Dikhou river as his own. The local Kachari inhabitants opposed his claim. Instead of resorting to warfare, both sides decided to solve this matter in a peaceful way. The Ahom challenged the Kacharis to build a canal from their settlement to Dikhou river within a duration of one night. If the Kacharis successfully complete the work within allotted time, the track will be theirs otherwise it would come under Ahom rule. The Kacharis accepted the challenge. They worked on the construction of the canal and were on the verge of completing it when the Ahoms resorted to tricks. On Suteuphaa’s personal instruction, some Ahom soldiers were hiding in the forest near the construction site. Each soldier had one rooster along with them. Seeing that the Kacharis were on the verge of completing the canal, the Ahom soldiers hiding in the forest, made the roosters to cock. Since it was full moon night, the Kacharis could not determine the actual time and they believed that they have lost the bet since cocking of rooster signifies morning. The Kacharis abandoned the track, and the Ahoms immediately occupied it.

Conflict with Mungkang

It is related in one Buranji or Chronicle that there was a war between the Naras or Shans of Mungkang, and the king of Mantara or Burma. The Naras were defeated and they appealed for help from Suteuphaa, as the ruler of Mungkang and Suteuphaa’s father king Sukaphaa shares the same branch of Shan tribes. The rulers of Mungkang and the Ahom kings used to communicate with each other as Brother King. In all ancient Ahom chronicles, the Naras or the Shans of Mungkang are regarded by the Ahoms as their close kinsmen. In reply to the appeal for help made by the ruler of Mungkang, Suteuphaa stated that if the Nara king of Mungkang agrees to give his daughter in marriage with Suteuphaa, then he would send a force for the assistance of Mungkang. The Nara king declined to do so. A quarrel ensued and Suteuphaa sent an expedition against the Naras, but his troops suffered defeat and the Burhagohain, who commanded them, were defeated. The Borgohain was promptly dispatched with a second force, but, instead of fighting, he came to terms with the enemy. On his return, he was disgraced and imprisoned. He was subsequently forgiven on the intercession of the other nobles. Some Ahom historians claimed that no conflict occurred between Ahoms and Naras, during the reign of Suteuphaa and the incident described above happened during the reign of Sukhaamphaa or Khora Raja.

Death and legacy
Suteuphaa died in 1281 CE. Among his four sons, the eldest son Subinphaa succeeded him as the king of Ahom kingdom. Suteuphaa followed the policy of expansion of his father’s kingdom. The manner in which he outwits the Kacharis and conquered the country which lies east to the Dikhou river, reveals that he had inherited his father, the king Sukaphaa’s wits and intelligence. The policy of expansion of Ahom kingdom will be followed by the later Ahom rulers and almost the entire Brahmaputra valley would come under their rule.

See also

 Ahom Dynasty
 Nagaland
 Sibsagar district
 Kachari kingdom
 Myanmar

Notes

References
 
 
 

Ahom kings
Ahom kingdom
13th-century Tai people

1280s deaths
Year of birth unknown
Year of death uncertain